The Act is the seventh studio album by American metalcore band The Devil Wears Prada. It was released on October 11, 2019, through Solid State Records. The album was produced by the band's keyboardist Jonathan Gering. It is the band's final album with founding bassist Andy Trick before his departure in September 2020.

Composition
Vocalist Mike Hranica mentioned the band scrapped 60 songs they had developed before settling with the 12 that make up the album. Hranica stated "We wanted to do something that actually tests the boundaries. You don't see that in rock, and there's so little invention in rock these days." The band was heavily inspired by the album Hiss Spun by Chelsea Wolfe when writing the album.

Track listing

Personnel 
All credits by AllMusic.

The Devil Wears Prada
 Mike Hranica – lead vocals, additional guitars
 Jeremy DePoyster – clean vocals, rhythm guitar, lead vocals on "Chemical"
 Kyle Sipress – lead guitar, backing vocals
 Andy Trick – bass
 Jonathan Gering – keyboards, synthesizer, programming, backing vocals, production
 Giuseppe Capolupo – drums

Additional musicians
 Sierra Kay – vocals on "Lines of Your Hands"

Additional personnel
 The Devil Wears Prada – production
 Sonny DiPerri – production, mixing
 Tom Baker – mastering
 Luke Sedmak – art design, layout
 Dan Seagrave – paintings

Charts

References 

2019 albums
The Devil Wears Prada (band) albums